The Turkish Armenian Reconciliation Commission was made in 2001 to help Turkey and Armenia be closer. The main goal was to make the governments more active.

In February 2002 an independent legal opinion commissioned by the International Center for Transitional Justice, at the request of Turkish Armenian Reconciliation Commission, concluded that the Ottoman Genocide of Armenians in 1915–1918 "include[d] all of the elements of the crime of genocide as defined in the [Genocide] Convention, and legal scholars as well as historians, politicians, journalists and other people would be justified in continuing to so describe them".

Members 
 Gunduz Aktan (Ankara) - resigned June 2003
 Alexander Arzoumanian (Yerevan)
 Ustun Erguder (Istanbul)
 Sadi Erguvenc (Istanbul) - resigned June 2003
 David Hovhannissian (Yerevan)
 Van Krikorian (New York)
 Andranik Migranian (Moscow)
 Özdem Sanberk (Istanbul) - resigned June 2003
 Ilter Turkmen (Istanbul)
 Vamik Volkan (Charlottesville) 

Newer Members (2003-2004)

 Emin Mahir Balcioglu (Geneva)
 Ahmet Evin (Istanbul)
 Ersin Kalaycioglu (Istanbul)
 Sule Kut (Istanbul)
 Ilter Turan (Istanbul)

Notes

References 
Turkish Armenian Reconciliation Commission
Turkish Armenian Reconciliation Commission - Armeniapedia.org

Armenia–Turkey relations
Truth and reconciliation commissions